The End of the Affair is a 1999 romantic drama film written and directed by Neil Jordan and starring Ralph Fiennes, Julianne Moore and Stephen Rea.

The film was based on The End of the Affair, a 1951 novel by British author Graham Greene, which had been adapted as a film in 1955 with Deborah Kerr. The film depicts an extramarital affair which lasts from 1939 to 1946. It is set during World War II and its aftermath.

Plot
Novelist Maurice Bendrix narrates the film as he begins a book with the line, "This is a diary of hate".

On a rainy London night in 1946, Maurice Bendrix has a chance meeting with Henry Miles, husband of Maurice’s former mistress, Sarah, who abruptly ended their affair two years before. Bendrix's obsession with Sarah is rekindled; he succumbs to his own jealousy and works his way back into her life.

As the story unfolds in 1946, we also see flashbacks of Bendrix with Sarah as they began their affair in 1939. Henry tells Bendrix that he believes Sarah is having an affair, so Bendrix hires the bumbling but amiable Mr. Parkis, who uses his young birthmarked son Lance to investigate. Sarah asks Bendrix to meet to talk about Henry and the cold tentativeness of their interaction is contrasted with the passion of their earlier encounters.

Bendrix learns from Parkis that Sarah has been making regular visits to a priest named Father Richard Smythe under the guise of false dentist visits and he grows increasingly jealous. Flashbacks show Bendrix expressing jealousy of Henry and asking Sarah to leave him.

Though Sarah and Bendrix express love to each other, the affair ends abruptly when a V-1 flying bomb explodes near Bendrix's building as he is out in the hallway. Bendrix falls down a staircase and awakes later, bloodied but not seriously hurt. He walks upstairs, where Sarah is shocked that he is alive. Bendrix accuses Sarah of being disappointed that he survived and she leaves, telling him "Love doesn't end, just because we don't see each other".

In 1946, Parkis obtains Sarah's diary and passes it on to Bendrix; it shows the affair from her perspective. After Bendrix is hurt by the bomb, Sarah runs downstairs and finds him still and not breathing. After trying to revive him, she runs back upstairs and begins to pray for Bendrix's life. Just as she says to God that she will stop seeing Bendrix if he is brought back, Bendrix comes into the room.

Now knowing why Sarah ended the affair, Bendrix follows Sarah and begs her to reconsider. Sarah tells Bendrix that she has felt dead without him and can no longer keep her "promise" to God. Henry, who has figured out that it is Bendrix who was Sarah's lover, desperately asks Sarah not to leave him but, with more persuasion from Bendrix, Sarah agrees to go away with him for a weekend. Henry tracks the couple down to tell them that Sarah has a terminal illness.

Bendrix stays with Henry and Sarah over her final days. At her funeral, Parkis tells Bendrix that his son's birthmark went away after Sarah kissed it during a chance encounter.  At Henry and Sarah's house, Bendrix completes his book and it is revealed that his diary of hate is directed toward God. While Sarah doesn't need to see God to love Him, Bendrix prays God will leave him alone, thereby finally acknowledging His existence.

Cast

Music 

Michael Nyman later used "Diary of Love" to open and close his solo album, The Piano Sings (2006). As with many of Nyman's 1990s scores, he incorporates material from his String Quartet No.3, which was in turn based on a choral piece titled Out of the Ruins.

Track listing
 Diary of Hate 2:38
 Henry 1:46
 The First Time 2:16
 Vigo Passage 1:04
 Jealous of the Rain 5:29
 The Party in Question 3:45
 Intimacy 3:04
 Smythe with a "Y" 1:55
 Dispossessed 3:22
 Love Doesn't End 4:31
 Diary of Love 5:16
 Breaking the Spell 1:20
 I Know your voice, Sarah 4:10
 Sarah dies 3:01
 The End of the Affair 2:59

A contemporary recording of "Haunted Heart" by Jo Stafford is heard in the background during several scenes and the closing credits.

Reception

Critical response
The film holds a 67% rating on Rotten Tomatoes based on reviews from 66 critics. The site's consensus states: "Neil Jordan has good direction with solid performances from Ralph Fiennes and Julianne Moore." On Metacritic it has a score of 65% based on reviews from 22 critics, indicating "generally favorable reviews".

Accolades 
Julianne Moore was nominated for an Academy Award for Best Actress and Roger Pratt was nominated for an Academy Award for Best Cinematography. The film also got several nominations at the BAFTA awards, including Best Cinematography (Roger Pratt), Best Costume Design (Sandy Powell), Best Film
(Stephen Woolley, Neil Jordan), Best Performance by an Actor in a Leading Role (Ralph Fiennes) and Best Performance by an Actress in a Leading Role (Julianne Moore). Neil Jordan won a BAFTA for Best Adapted Screenplay. Neil Jordan was nominated for the Best Director (Motion Picture) Golden Globe and Julianne Moore was nominated for Best Performance by an Actress in a Motion Picture – Drama.

Ralph Fiennes also won the best eyewear award at the GQ Men of 2000 Awards for the pair of National Health Service spectacles he sported in the film.

The film is recognised by American Film Institute in these lists:
 2002: AFI's 100 Years...100 Passions – Nominated

References

Further reading
 Tibbetts, John C., and James M. Welsh, eds. The Encyclopedia of Novels Into Film (2nd ed. 2005) pp 117–118.

External links
 
 
 

1999 films
Films with atheism-related themes
1999 romantic drama films
American romantic drama films
BAFTA winners (films)
British romantic drama films
Columbia Pictures films
Films about writers
Films based on British novels
Films based on romance novels
Films based on works by Graham Greene
Films directed by Neil Jordan
Films set in Brighton
Films set in London
Films set in 1939
Films set in 1946
War romance films
American World War II films
British World War II films
Films about adultery in the United Kingdom
Films whose writer won the Best Adapted Screenplay BAFTA Award
Films scored by Michael Nyman
2000s English-language films
1990s English-language films
1990s American films
2000s American films
1990s British films
2000s British films